Donald Harper (26 October 1921 – 1990) was an English professional footballer who played in the Football League for Mansfield Town.

References

1921 births
1990 deaths
English footballers
Association football forwards
English Football League players
Mansfield Town F.C. players
Chesterfield F.C. players